Atanasio Bimbacci (circa 1654 -1734) was an Italian painter of the Baroque period, active mainly in his native Florence. He painted a St Louis Gonzaga for the church of Santa Maria Maddalena de' Pazzi in Florence. He also decorated a number of residences. He was a pupil of Ciro Ferri. Others describe him as a follower of Luca Giordano.

References

1654 births
1734 deaths
17th-century Italian painters
Italian male painters
18th-century Italian painters
Painters from Florence
Italian Baroque painters
18th-century Italian male artists